Marquette Rail is a short line railroad operating in Michigan.  It is based in Ludington and operates  of trackage north from Grand Rapids, Michigan, where connections with  CSX and Norfolk Southern are located. It serves chemical, paper products and various general freight customers. In 2012, the railroad expected an annual profit of about $4 million on income of $13 million.

The company was founded in November 2005 by Kevin Ruble, a nationally active railroad consultant, who purchased a CSX line running north from Grand Rapids to Ludington and Manistee. The railroad maintains its trackage to  standards, and operates, as of 2008, seven EMD GP38-2 and EMD SD40-2 locomotives.  

On 8 February 2012, RailAmerica, a national short-line operator, announced that it planned to purchase Marquette Rail for $40 million. RailAmerica and Marquette Rail were subsequently purchased by Genesee & Wyoming. Prior to its acquisition, Marquette Rail was an employee-owned company.

References

External links

Marquette Rail official webpage - Genesee and Wyoming website

Michigan railroads
Railway companies established in 2005
RailAmerica